Neohexene is the hydrocarbon compound with the chemical formula .  It is a colorless liquid, with properties similar to other hexenes.  It is a precursor to commercial synthetic musk perfumes.

Preparation and reactions
Neohexene is prepared by ethenolysis of diisobutene, an example of a metathesis reaction:

It is a building block to synthetic musks by its reaction with p-cymene.  It is also used in the industrial preparation of terbinafine.

In the study of C-H activation, neohexene is often used as a hydrogen acceptor.

References

Alkenes